Héctor Antonio Pérez (born June 6, 1996) is a Dominican professional baseball pitcher in the Tampa Bay Rays organization. He has played in Major League Baseball (MLB) for the Toronto Blue Jays.

Career

Houston Astros
Pérez signed with the Houston Astros as an international free agent in 2014. In 2015, he was assigned to the Rookie-level Dominican Summer League Astros, and later promoted to the Gulf Coast League Astros and Rookie Advanced Greeneville Astros. In 17 pitching appearances, Pérez posted a 2–0 win–loss record, 1.64 earned run average (ERA), and 50 strikeouts in 55 innings pitched. He split time in 2016 with the Short Season-A Tri-City ValleyCats and the Class-A Quad Cities River Bandits, and worked to a 4–1 combined record, 3.15 ERA, and 80 strikeouts in 60 innings. Perez opened the 2017 season with the River Bandits, and was later promoted to the Advanced-A Buies Creek Astros. In a career-high 107 innings, Pérez posted a 7–6 record, 3.44 ERA, and 128 strikeouts.

Pérez was assigned to Buies Creek to begin 2018, and earned a promotion to the Double-A Corpus Christi Hooks in early July.

Toronto Blue Jays
On July 30, 2018, the Astros traded Pérez, Ken Giles, and David Paulino to the Blue Jays for Roberto Osuna. The Blue Jays added him to their 40-man roster after the season. He spent the 2019 season with the Double-A New Hampshire Fisher Cats, recording a 7-6 record and 4.60 ERA in 26 games. He made his major league debut September 16, 2020. With the 2020 Toronto Blue Jays, Pérez appeared in 1 game, compiling a 0-0 record with 10.80 ERA and 1 strikeouts in 1.2 innings pitched.

Cincinnati Reds
On January 22, 2021, Pérez was traded to the Cincinnati Reds in exchange for cash considerations or a player to be named later (Darlin Guzman was sent to Toronto as the PTBNL on July 8). After struggling to a 9.35 ERA across 7 appearances for the Triple-A Louisville Bats, Pérez was designated for assignment on June 2, 2021. At the time of his designation, Pérez had not appeared in a game with Cincinnati. He was outrighted to Triple-A Louisville on June 7.

Baltimore Orioles
On May 11, 2022, Perez signed a minor league deal with the Baltimore Orioles.

Tampa Bay Rays
On December 7, 2022, he was claimed by the Tampa Bay Rays in the minor league phase of the Rule 5 draft.

References

External links

1996 births
Living people
Buies Creek Astros players
Chattanooga Lookouts players
Corpus Christi Hooks players
Dominican Republic expatriate baseball players in the United States
Dominican Summer League Astros players
Greeneville Astros players
Gulf Coast Astros players
Louisville Bats players
Major League Baseball pitchers
Major League Baseball players from the Dominican Republic
New Hampshire Fisher Cats players
Quad Cities River Bandits players
Sportspeople from Santo Domingo
Tigres del Licey players
Toronto Blue Jays players
Tri-City ValleyCats players